Fort Stražnik (Montenegrin: Tvrđava Stražnik/Тврђава Стражник, German: Crkvice Westfort), also known as the Eagle's Nest, is a former fortification of the Austro-Hungarian Empire located to the west of the village and former military base of Crkvice in southwestern Montenegro. Primary purpose of the fort was defence against the bordering Ottoman Empire.

See also
Crkvice
Krivošije
Fort Kom

References

Straznik
Kotor Municipality
Krivošije